Trichopsocus clarus is a species of Psocodea (formerly Psocoptera) from the Trichopsocidae family. It can be found across Europe, in United Kingdom, Ireland, on Azores, Canary Islands, in Finland, France, Germany, Italy, Latvia, Madeira, Poland, Portugal, Spain, Sweden, Switzerland, and the Netherlands. The species are either yellow or orange coloured. It is also found in Australia and New Zealand

Habitat
The species is found on foliage of a range of trees.

References

Trichopsocidae
Insects described in 1908
Psocoptera of Europe
Taxa named by Nathan Banks